Now It's My Turn is a 1976 album by American jazz singer Betty Carter.

Track listing
"Music Maestro, Please"/"Swing Brother Swing" – 4:29
"I Was Telling Him About You" – 5:04
"Wagon Wheels" – 7:17
"New Blues (You Purr)" (Betty Carter) – 5:25
"Most Gentlemen Don't Like Love" (Cole Porter) – 3:03
"Making Dreams Come True" – 2:55
"Open the Door" (Carter) – 4:36
"Just Friends"/"Star Eyes" (John Klenner, Sam M. Lewis)/(Gene de Paul, Don Raye) – 4:35
"No More Words" – 7:04

Personnel 
Recorded March 9–10, June 21–22, 1976 at Sound Ideas Studio C :
 Betty Carter – vocals
 John Hicks – piano
 Walter Booker – bass
 Eddie Moore – drums

Production
 Fred Bailin – producer
 Joe Ferla – recording engineer

References

1976 albums
Betty Carter albums
Roulette Records albums